The classical composer Leopold Koželuch left around 400 compositions. Among these there are about thirty symphonies, twenty-two piano concertos, including a concerto for piano four-hands, arguably one of the best examples of this rare genre, two clarinet concertos, twenty-four violin sonatas, sixty-three piano trios, six string quartets, two oratorios (one of which, Moses in Ägypten, has recently been produced and recorded), nine cantatas and various liturgical works.  Among his music there are also operas and works for ballet, which—with the exception of one opera —have yet to be heard in recent years. Numerous arrangements by him of Scottish songs for the Edinburgh collector George Thomson were popular, and some of these have also been recorded. 

Koželuch's substantial output of keyboard compositions reflected the promotion of his reputation as a specialist keyboard virtuoso. By contrast, the musicologist Allan Badley labels Koželuch's symphonic compositions as "modest by the standards of the time".

His works are currently cataloged using Poštolka numbers, after the work of the musicologist Milan Poštolka.

Symphonies and overtures 
 P I: 1 \ Symphony in D major "L'Arlechino"
 P I: 2 \ Symphony in C major
 P I: 3 \ Symphony in D major Op. 22 No. 1
 P I: 4 \ Symphony in F major Op. 22 No. 2
 P I: 5 \ Symphony in G minor Op. 22 No. 3
 P I: 6 \ Symphony in C major Op. 24 No. 1
 P I: 7 \ Symphony in A major Op. 24 No. 2
 P I: 8 \ Symphony in G major Op. 24 No. 3
 P I: 9 \ Symphony in C major
 P I:10 \ Symphony in A major "A la Française"
 P I:11 \ Symphony in B flat major "L'irresoluto"
 P I:A1 \ Symphony in A major
 P I:D1 \ Symphony in D major (lost)
 P I:D2 \ Symphony in D major
 P I:D3 \ Symphony in D major
 P I:E1 \ Symphony in E major
 P I:F1 \ Symphony in F major
 P I:G1 \ Symphony in G major
 P II:1 \ Sinfonia concertante in E flat major for mandolin, trumpet in E, double bass, piano and orchestra
 P II:2 \ Sinfonia concertante in C major for piano, flute, oboe, bassoon, cello and orchestra
 P III:1 \ Overture in G major
 P III:1 \ Overture Op. 9 in G major
 P III:2 \ Overture in D major

Concertos 
 P IV: 1 \ Keyboard Concerto Op. 12 in F major
 P IV: 2 \ Keyboard Concerto Op. 13 in B flat major
 P IV: 3 \ Keyboard Concerto Op. 11 in G major
 P IV: 4 \ Keyboard Concerto Op. 16 in A major
 P IV: 5 \ Keyboard Concerto Op. 15 in E flat major
 P IV: 6 \ Keyboard Concerto in C major
 P IV: 7 \ Keyboard Concerto Op. 25 in D major
 P IV: 8 \ Concerto for keyboard 4 hands in B flat major
 P IV: 9 \ Harpsichord Concerto in D major
 P IV:10 \ Harpsichord Concerto in D major
 P IV:11 \ Rondo Concerto for harpsichord in E flat major
 P IV:12 \ Harpsichord Concerto in E major
 P IV:13 \ Harpsichord Concerto in F major
 P IV:14 \ Keyboard Concerto in F major
 P IV:15 \ Keyboard Concerto Op. 36 in C major
 P IV:16 \ Keyboard Concerto Op. 45 in E flat major
 P IV:17 \ Piano Concerto in C major
 P IV:18 \ Piano Concerto in C major
 P IV:19 \ Fantasia for piano & orchestra in D minor
 P IV:20 \ Harpsichord Concerto in E major
 P IV:D1 \ Harpsichord Concerto in D major
 P IV:D2 \ Piano Concerto in D major
 P IV:F1 \ Harpsichord Concerto in F major
 P V: 1 \ Clarinet Concerto in E flat major
 P V: 2 \ Clarinet Concerto in E flat major
 P V: 3 \ Sonata for clarinet & orchestra in E flat major
 P V:B1 \ Bassoon Concerto in B flat major
 P V:C1 \ Bassoon Concerto in C major

Serenades and parthias 
 P VI: 1 \ Serenade Op. 11 No. 1 in D major
 P VI: 2 \ Serenade Op. 11 No. 2 in E flat major
 P VI: 3 \ Parthia in F major
 P VI: 4 \ Divertimento for wind quintet in D major
 P VI: 5 \ Divertimento for wind quintet in D major
 P VI: 6 \ Notturno in D major
 P VI: 7 \ Divertimento for wind quintet in E flat major
 P VI: 8 \ Parthia in F major
 P VI: 9 \ Divertimento for piano & winds in E flat major
 P VI:10 \ Divertimento for piano & winds in E flat major
 P VI:B1 \ Parthia a la Camera in B flat major
 P VI:B2 \ Parthia a la Camera in B flat major
 P VI:B3 \ Parthia a la Camera in B flat major
 P VI:c1 \ Parthia a la Camera in C minor
 P VI:d1 \ Parthia a la Camera in D minor
 P VI:D1 \ Wind Symphony in D major
 P VI:d2 \ Parthia a la Camera in D minor
 P VI:Es1 \ Cassation in E flat major
 P VI:Es2 \ Wind quintet in E flat major
 P VI:Es3 \ Parthia in E flat major
 P VI:F1 \ Parthia in F major (lost)

Dances and marches 
 P VII:1 \ 6 Contredanses
 P VII:2 \ 12 German Dances
 P VII:3 \ 15 German Dances
 P VII:4 \ 15 German Dances
 P VII:5 \ 12 German Dances
 P VII:6 \ March for Wiener Freykorps in C major

String quartets 
 P VIII:1 \ String Quartet Op. 32 No. 1 in B flat major
 P VIII:2 \ String Quartet Op. 32 No. 2 in G major
 P VIII:3 \ String Quartet Op. 32 No. 3 in E flat major
 P VIII:4 \ String Quartet Op. 33 No. 1 in C major
 P VIII:5 \ String Quartet Op. 33 No. 2 in A major
 P VIII:6 \ String Quartet Op. 33 No. 3 in F major

Keyboard trios 
 P IX: 1 \ Piano Trio Op. 3 No. 1 in D major
 P IX: 2 \ Piano Trio Op. 3 No. 2 in F major
 P IX: 3 \ Piano Trio Op. 3 No. 3 in E flat major
 P IX: 4 \ Piano Trio Op. 6 No. 1 in C major
 P IX: 5 \ Piano Trio Op. 6 No. 2 in G major
 P IX: 6 \ Piano Trio Op. 6 No. 3 in B flat major
 P IX: 7 \ Piano Trio Op. 21 No. 1 in C major
 P IX: 8 \ Piano Trio Op. 21 No. 2 in A major
 P IX: 9 \ Piano Trio Op. 21 No. 3 in E flat major
 P IX:10 \ Piano Trio Op. 23 No. 1 in G major
 P IX:11 \ Piano Trio Op. 23 No. 2 in C minor
 P IX:12 \ Piano Trio Op. 23 No. 3 in F major
 P IX:13 \ Piano Trio Op. 27 No. 1 in B flat major
 P IX:14 \ Piano Trio Op. 27 No. 2 in A major
 P IX:15 \ Piano Trio Op. 27 No. 3 in G minor
 P IX:16 \ Piano Trio Op. 28 No. 1 in E flat major
 P IX:17 \ Piano Trio Op. 28 No. 2 in D major
 P IX:18 \ Piano Trio Op. 28 No. 3 in E minor
 P IX:19 \ Piano Trio in G major
 P IX:20 \ Piano Trio in E flat major
 P IX:21 \ Piano Trio in C major
 P IX:22 \ Piano Trio in E flat major
 P IX:23 \ Piano Trio in F major
 P IX:24 \ Piano Trio Op. 34 No. 1 in B flat major
 P IX:25 \ Piano Trio Op. 34 No. 2 in G major
 P IX:26 \ Piano Trio Op. 34 No. 3 in C major
 P IX:27 \ Piano Trio Op. 36 in C major
 P IX:28 \ Piano Trio Op. 37 No. 1 in D major
 P IX:29 \ Piano Trio Op. 37 No. 2 in F major
 P IX:30 \ Piano Trio Op. 37 No. 3 in G major
 P IX:31 \ Piano Trio Op. 40 No. 1 in F major
 P IX:32 \ Piano Trio Op. 40 No. 2 in C major
 P IX:33 \ Piano Trio Op. 40 No. 3 in E minor
 P IX:34 \ Piano Trio Op. 41 No. 1 in B flat major
 P IX:35 \ Piano Trio Op. 41 No. 2 in D major
 P IX:36 \ Piano Trio Op. 41 No. 3 in G major
 P IX:37 \ Piano Trio Op. 44 No. 1 in F major
 P IX:38 \ Piano Trio Op. 44 No. 2 in G major
 P IX:39 \ Piano Trio Op. 44 No. 3 in D major
 P IX:40 \ Piano Trio Op. 46 No. 1 in G major
 P IX:41 \ Piano Trio Op. 46 No. 2 in B flat major
 P IX:42 \ Piano Trio Op. 46 No. 3 in F major
 P IX:43 \ Piano Trio Op. 47 No. 1 in C major
 P IX:44 \ Piano Trio Op. 47 No. 2 in A major
 P IX:45 \ Piano Trio Op. 47 No. 3 in G minor
 P IX:46 \ Piano Trio Op. 48 No. 1 in E flat major
 P IX:47 \ Piano Trio Op. 48 No. 2 in A major
 P IX:48 \ Piano Trio Op. 48 No. 3 in B flat major
 P IX:49 \ Piano Trio Op. 49 No. 1 in D major
 P IX:50 \ Piano Trio Op. 49 No. 2 in E flat major
 P IX:51 \ Piano Trio Op. 49 No. 3 in C major
 P IX:52 \ Piano Trio Op. 50 No. 1 in B flat major
 P IX:53 \ Piano Trio Op. 50 No. 2 in D major
 P IX:54 \ Piano Trio Op. 50 No. 3 in E flat major
 P IX:55 \ Piano Trio Op. 63 No. 1 in B flat major
 P IX:56 \ Piano Trio Op. 63 No. 2 in F major
 P IX:57 \ Piano Trio Op. 63 No. 3 in C major
 P IX:58 \ Piano Trio Op. 64 No. 1 in D major
 P IX:59 \ Piano Trio Op. 64 No. 2 in G major
 P IX:60 \ Piano Trio Op. 64 No. 3 in E flat major
 P IX:61 \ Piano Trio Op. 52 No. 1 in D major
 P IX:62 \ Piano Trio Op. 52 No. 2 in C major
 P IX:63 \ Piano Trio Op. 52 No. 3 in B flat major
 P IX:A1 \ Piano Trio in A major
 P IX:D1 \ Piano Trio in D major
 P IX:F1 \ Piano Trio in F major
 P IX:G1 \ Piano Trio in G major

Keyboard sonatas 
The complete sonatas for keyboard instrument by Leopold Koželuh was published in four volumes by Bärenreiter, the editor was Christopher Hogwood.
 P X: 1 \ Keyboard Sonata with violin in D major
 P X: 2 \ Keyboard Sonata with violin in F major
 P X: 3 \ Keyboard Sonata with violin in E flat major
 P X: 4 \ Keyboard Sonata with violin Op. 10 No. 1 in E flat major
 P X: 5 \ Keyboard Sonata with violin Op. 10 No. 2 in C major
 P X: 6 \ Keyboard Sonata with violin Op. 17 No. 1 in F minor
 P X: 7 \ Keyboard Sonata with violin Op. 17 No. 2 in A major
 P X: 8 \ Keyboard Sonata with violin Op. 17 No. 3 in E flat major
 P X: 9 \ Keyboard Sonata with violin in A major
 P X:10 \ Keyboard Sonata with violin Op. 20 No. 1 in D major (lost)
 P X:11 \ Keyboard Sonata with violin Op. 20 No. 2 in C major (lost)
 P X:12 \ Keyboard Sonata with violin Op. 20 No. 3 in G major (lost)
 P X:13 \ Keyboard Sonata with violin Op. 18 No. 1 in G minor
 P X:14 \ Keyboard Sonata with violin Op. 18 No. 2 in C major
 P X:15 \ Keyboard Sonata with violin Op. 18 No. 3 in A flat major
 P X:16 \ Keyboard Sonata with violin Op. 16 No. 1 in G major
 P X:17 \ Keyboard Sonata with violin Op. 16 No. 2 in C minor
 P X:18 \ Keyboard Sonata with violin Op. 16 No. 3 in F major
 P X:19 \ Keyboard Sonata with violin Op. 23 No. 1 in E major
 P X:20 \ Keyboard Sonata with violin Op. 23 No. 2 in G major
 P X:21 \ Keyboard Sonata with violin Op. 23 No. 3 in D major
 P X:22 \ Keyboard Sonata with violin Op. 23 No. 4 in B flat major
 P X:23 \ Keyboard Sonata with violin Op. 23 No. 5 in F minor
 P X:24 \ Keyboard Sonata with violin Op. 23 No. 6 in G major
 P XI:1 \ Sonata for keyboard 4 hands Op. 4 in F major
 P XI:2 \ Sonata for keyboard 4 hands Op. 8 No. 3 in B flat major
 P XI:3 \ Sonata for keyboard 4 hands Op. 19 in F major
 P XI:4 \ Sonata for keyboard 4 hands Op. 29 in B flat major
 P XI:5 \ Sonata for keyboard 4 hands Op. 12 No. 1 in C major
 P XI:6 \ Sonata for keyboard 4 hands Op. 12 No. 2 in F major
 P XI:7 \ Sonata for keyboard 4 hands Op. 12 No. 3 in D major
 P XII: 1 \ Harpsichord Sonata in F major
 P XII: 2 \ Keyboard Sonata in A major
 P XII: 3 \ Keyboard Sonata Op. 13 No. 1 in E flat major
 P XII: 4 \ Keyboard Sonata in F major
 P XII: 5 \ Keyboard Sonata in C major
 P XII: 6 \ Keyboard Sonata Op. 13 No. 3 in E minor
 P XII: 7 \ Keyboard Sonata Op. 13 No. 2 in G major
 P XII: 8 \ Keyboard Sonata Op. 1 No. 1 in F major
 P XII: 9 \ Keyboard Sonata Op. 1 No. 2 in E flat major
 P XII:10 \ Keyboard Sonata Op. 1 No. 3 in D major
 P XII:11 \ Keyboard Sonata Op. 2 No. 1 in B flat major
 P XII:12 \ Keyboard Sonata Op. 2 No. 2 in A major
 P XII:13 \ Keyboard Sonata Op. 2 No. 3 in C minor
 P XII:14 \ Keyboard Sonata in D major
 P XII:15 \ Keyboard Sonata Op. 8 No. 1 in E flat major
 P XII:16 \ Keyboard Sonata Op. 8 No. 2 in C major
 P XII:17 \ Keyboard Sonata Op. 15 No. 1 in G minor
 P XII:18 \ Keyboard Sonata Op. 15 No. 2 in C major
 P XII:19 \ Keyboard Sonata Op. 15 No. 3 in A flat major
 P XII:20 \ Keyboard Sonata Op. 17 No. 1 in F minor
 P XII:21 \ Keyboard Sonata Op. 17 No. 2 in A major
 P XII:22 \ Keyboard Sonata Op. 17 No. 3 in E flat major
 P XII:23 \ Keyboard Sonata Op. 20 No. 1 in F major
 P XII:24 \ Keyboard Sonata Op. 20 No. 2 in C major
 P XII:25 \ Keyboard Sonata Op. 20 No. 3 in D minor
 P XII:26 \ Keyboard Sonata Op. 26 No. 1 in D major
 P XII:27 \ Keyboard Sonata Op. 26 No. 2 in A minor
 P XII:28 \ Keyboard Sonata Op. 26 No. 3 in E flat major
 P XII:29 \ Keyboard Sonata Op. 30 No. 1 in B flat major
 P XII:30 \ Keyboard Sonata Op. 30 No. 2 in G major
 P XII:31 \ Keyboard Sonata Op. 30 No. 3 in C minor
 P XII:32 \ Keyboard Sonata Op. 35 No. 1 in F major
 P XII:33 \ Keyboard Sonata Op. 35 No. 2 in A major
 P XII:34 \ Keyboard Sonata Op. 35 No. 3 in G minor
 P XII:35 \ Keyboard Sonata Op. 38 No. 1 in E flat major
 P XII:36 \ Keyboard Sonata Op. 38 No. 2 in C major
 P XII:37 \ Keyboard Sonata Op. 38 No. 3 in F minor
 P XII:38 \ Piano Sonata Op. 51 No. 1 in E flat major
 P XII:39 \ Piano Sonata Op. 51 No. 2 in C minor
 P XII:40 \ Piano Sonata Op. 51 No. 3 in D minor
 P XII:41 \ Harpsichord Sonata in C major
 P XII:42 \ Harpsichord Sonata in E flat major
 P XII:43 \ Piano Sonata in B flat major (lost)
 P XII:44 \ Piano Sonata in A major (lost)
 P XII:45 \ Piano Sonata in E minor (lost)
 P XII:46 \ Keyboard Sonata in G major (lost)
 P XII:47 \ Keyboard Sonata in F major (lost)
 P XII:48 \ Keyboard Sonata in E flat major (lost)
 P XII:49 \ Piano Sonata in G major (lost)
 P XII:50 \ Piano Sonata in G major
 P XII:C1 \ Harpsichord Sonata in C major
 P XII:D1 \ Harpsichord Sonata in D major
 P XII:Es1 \ Harpsichord Sonata in E flat major
 P XII:Es2 \ Harpsichord Sonata in E flat major
 P XII:G1 \ Harpsichord Sonata in G major
 P XII:G2 \ Harpsichord Sonata in G major

Keyboard pieces 
 P XIII: 1 \ Andante & March for harpsichord
 P XIII: 2 \ La Chasse for keyboard Op. 5 in B flat major
 P XIII: 3 \ Caprice for piano Op. 45 No. 1 in E flat major
 P XIII: 4 \ Caprice for piano Op. 45 No. 2 in B flat major
 P XIII: 5 \ Caprice for piano Op. 45 No. 3 in C minor
 P XIII: 6 \ Piece for piano Op. 43 No. 1 in A minor
 P XIII: 7 \ Piece for piano Op. 43 No. 2 in C major
 P XIII: 8 \ Piece for piano Op. 43 No. 3 in C major
 P XIII: 9 \ Piece for piano Op. 43 No. 4 in C major
 P XIII:10 \ Piece for piano Op. 43 No. 5 in F major
 P XIII:11 \ Piece for piano Op. 43 No. 6 in G major
 P XIII:12 \ Piece for piano Op. 43 No. 7 in G major
 P XIII:13 \ Piece for piano Op. 43 No. 8 in C major
 P XIII:14 \ Piece for piano Op. 43 No. 9 in A minor
 P XIII:15 \ Piece for piano Op. 43 No. 10 in B minor
 P XIII:16 \ Piece for piano Op. 43 No. 11 in D minor
 P XIII:17 \ Piece for piano Op. 43 No. 12 in E flat major
 P XIII:a1 \ Sicilienne for keyboard in A minor
 P XIII:C1 \ Bernoise for keyboard in C major
 P XIII:F1 \ La chasse au sanglier for keyboard in F major
 P XIII:g1 \ Pastorale for keyboard in G minor
 P XIII:G1 \ Romance for keyboard in G major
 P XIII:G2 \ Air cosaque for keyboard in G major
 P XIV: 1 \ 13 Menuets for harpsichord
 P XIV: 2 \ Menuetto angloise for harpsichord in F major
 P XIV: 3 \ Polonese for harpsichord in C major
 P XIV: 4 \ 9 Menuets for harpsichord
 P XIV: 5 \ 6 Contredanses for keyboard
 P XIV: 6 \ Wachtel Menuett for keyboard in F sharp minor
 P XIV: 7 \ 12 Menuets for keyboard
 P XIV: 8 \ 15 German Dances for keyboard
 P XIV: 9 \ 15 German Dances & 6 Ecossaises for piano
 P XIV:10 \ Marsch für das Corps der Freywilligen des Handelstandes von Wien in C major
 P XIV:11 \ 12 German Dances for piano
 P XIV:C1 \ 12 Ländler for keyboard in C major
 P XIV:D1 \ 10 German Dances & 12 Ländler for piano
 P XIV:Es1 \ 10 Ländler & Coda for piano in E flat major
 P XIV:F1 \ 7 Polonaises for piano

Other chamber music 
 P XV:1 \ Violin Duet in D major
 P XV:2 \ Violin Duet in B flat major
 P XV:3 \ Violin Duet in G major
 P XV:4 \ Trio for flute, violin & cello in G major
 P XV:5 \ Hunting Fanfare for 3 horns in C major
 P XV:6 \ Duet for violin & viola in D major
 P XV:7 \ Duet for flute & cello in E minor
 P XV:8 \ Duet for flute & cello in C major
 P XV:9 \ Duet for flute & cello in D major

Oratorios 
 P XVI:1 \ Moisè in Egitto
 P XVI:2 \ La Giuditta (lost)

Choral pieces and part-songs 
 P XVII:1 \ Chorus for La Galatea P XIX:7 in C major
 P XVIII:1 \ Notturno Op. 42 No. 1 in C minor
 P XVIII:2 \ Notturno Op. 42 No. 2 in G minor
 P XVIII:3 \ Notturno Op. 42 No. 3 in B flat major
 P XVIII:4 \ Notturno Op. 42 No. 4 in D minor
 P XVIII:5 \ Notturno Op. 42 No. 5 in E flat major
 P XVIII:6 \ Notturno Op. 42 No. 6 in C major
 P XVIII:B1 \ Quartet: Dum ti dum in B flat major

Secular cantatas and arias 
 P XIX:1 \ Denis Klage auf den Todt Marien Theresien
 P XIX:2 \ Cantata: Quanto è mai tormentosa
 P XIX:3 \ Cantata Op. 11: Joseph, der Menschheit Segen
 P XIX:4 \ Cantata to Maria Theresia Paradis
 P XIX:5 \ Cantata Op. 8: Chloe, siehst du nicht voll grausen
 P XIX:6 \ Cantata for the Coronation of Leopold II
 P XIX:7 \ La Galatea (lost)
 P XIX:8 \ In un fiero contrasto
 P XIX:9 \ Cantata pastorale per la Natività di Nostro Signor Gesù Christo (lost)
 P XX:1 \ Caro bene in E flat major
 P XX:2 \ Misero me! che veggo in E flat major
 P XX:3 \ Se mai senti in G major

Songs 
 P XXI: 1 \ 15 Lieder
 P XXI: 2 \ 12 Lieder
 P XXI: 3 \ The happy Pair in A flat major
 P XXI: 4 \ 12 Ariette Op. 31
 P XXI: 5 \ De l'arbre ces fruits in G major
 P XXI: 6 \ Marschlied für das Wiener Freycorps in C major
 P XXI: 7 \ Marschlied für das akademische Bürgercorps in B flat major
 P XXI: 8 \ 3 Airs François
 P XXI: 9 \ Hört! Maurer, auf der Weisheit lehren in A major
 P XXI:10 \ In questa tomba oscura in C minor
 P XXI:11 \ 12 Canzonette
 P XXI:12 \ Mein Mädchen in D major
 P XXI:13 \ Des Kriegers Abschied in C major
 P XXI:14 \  in C minor
 P XXI:15 \ Let the declining damask rose in G major
 P XXI:C1 \ Aufruf an die Böhmen in C major
 P XXI:C2 \ 27 Solfeggi
 P XXII:1 \ Scottish, Irish & Welsh Songs
 P XXII:2 \ Welsh Songs
 P XXII:A1 \ Scottish Melodies arranged for keyboard

Operas 
 P XXIII:1 \ Le Muzet (lost)
 P XXIII:2 \ Debora e Sisara (lost)
 P XXIII:3 \ Didone abbandonata (lost)
 P XXIII:4 \ Télémaque dans l'île de Calypso (opera) (lost)
 P XXIII:5 \ Judith und Holofernes (lost)
 P XXIII:6 \ Gustav Vasa

Ballets 
 P XXIV:1 \ Ballet Op. 39: La ritrovata figlia di Ottone II
 P XXIV:2 \ Arlechino (lost)
 P XXIV:3 \ Ballet in C major
 P XXIV:4 \ Ballet in F major
 P XXIV:5 \ Pantomime in A minor
 P XXIV:6 \ Télémaque dans l'île de Calypso (ballet) (lost)

Sacred music 
 P XXV: 1 \ Mass in C major
 P XXV: 2 \ Tantum ergo in F major
 P XXV: 3 \ Mandavit Deus in E flat major
 P XXV: 4 \ Quaeso ad me veni in E flat major
 P XXV: 5 \ Umbra noctis orbem tangit in B flat major
 P XXV: 6 \ Domine non sul dignus in E flat major
 P XXV: 7 \ Gottes Liebe in C sharp minor
 P XXV:A1 \ Mass in A major
 P XXV:A2 \ Offertory in A major
 P XXV:A3 \ Aeh quanta vis amoris in A major
 P XXV:A4 \ Mater dolorosa in A major
 P XXV:B1 \ Ad hoc festum chori in B flat major
 P XXV:B2 \ Omni die Mariae in B flat major
 P XXV:B3 \ Magne Deus audi in B flat major
 P XXV:C1 \ Missa brevis in C major
 P XXV:D1 \ Missa brevis in D major
 P XXV:D2 \ Amati quaeso montes in D major
 P XXV:Es1 \ Cernis o anima in E flat major
 P XXV:g1 \ Mass in G minor

References

Kozeluch, Leopold